Naresh Chandra Chaki was an Indian politician belonging to All India Trinamool Congress. He was elected as a legislator in West Bengal Legislative Assembly from Ranaghat Dakshin in 1972 and from Chakdaha in 2011. He died of cancer on 24 February 2014 at the age of 79.

References

2014 deaths
Trinamool Congress politicians from West Bengal
West Bengal MLAs 1972–1977
West Bengal MLAs 2011–2016
1930s births